Mount Davidson is both the highest and most topographically prominent mountain in both Storey County, Nevada, and the Virginia Range.  The mountain forms a backdrop for the mining boomtown of Virginia City which was built above the Comstock Lode silver strike.

Mount Davidson was named after Donald Davidson, a geologist.

Mark Twain mentions a flag on Mount Davidson in his semi-autobiographical book Roughing It.
As of 2003 the flagpole was still standing.

References

Mountains of Nevada
Landforms of Storey County, Nevada
Virginia City, Nevada